Alen Krcić (born 19 November 1988) is a Slovenian football midfielder who last played for Bravo.

External links
 Player profile at NZS 

1988 births
Living people
Sportspeople from Kranj
Slovenian footballers
Association football midfielders
Slovenian Second League players
Slovenian PrvaLiga players
NK Triglav Kranj players
F.C. Crotone players
Slovenian expatriate footballers
Expatriate footballers in Italy
Slovenian expatriate sportspeople in Italy
NK Bravo players